Taihe railway station is a railway station located in Taihe County, Ji'an, Jiangxi, China.

History
The station opened in 1996 with the Beijing–Kowloon railway.

On 1 January 2006, the name of this station was changed from Jinggangshan to Taihe. A new Jinggangshan railway station opened in 2007 much closer to Jinggangshan itself. The new high-speed line opened in December.

In preparation for the opening of the Nanchang–Ganzhou high-speed railway, the station was rebuilt. The new station opened on 16 July 2019.

References

Railway stations in Jiangxi
Railway stations in China opened in 1996